Valentine Building may refer to:

Valentine Building (Juneau, Alaska), NRHP-listed in Juneau, Alaska
Valentine on Broadway Hotel, Kansas City, Missouri, NRHP-listed in Jackson County
The Coliseum-Duplex Envelope Company Building, Richmond, Virginia, also known as Valentine Auction Company Building, NRHP-listed

See also
Valentine House (disambiguation)
Valentine School (disambiguation)